Manuel Guinard (born 15 November 1995) is a French tennis player.

Guinard competes mainly on the ITF Men's Circuit and ATP Challenger Tour.
He has a career high ATP singles ranking of World No. 134 achieved on 31 October 2022, and a career high ATP doubles ranking of World No. 146 achieved on 3 October 2022.

Professional career

2019–2020: Grand Slam doubles debut and first win in doubles 
Guinard made his Grand Slam main draw debut at the 2019 French Open after receiving a wildcard for the doubles main draw, partnering Arthur Rinderknech.

At the 2020 French Open he reached the second round for his first Grand Slam win in doubles also as a wildcard partnering Rinderknech.

2021: First Challenger final, Top 250 singles debut
He made his first Challenger final at the 2021 Open du Pays d'Aix where he lost to Carlos Taberner. He reached the top 250 on 8 November 2021 at World No. 247.

2022: Maiden challenger title, Major, ATP & Top 150 debut in singles & doubles 
He reached a career-high doubles ranking of World No. 155 on 17 January 2022, after winning the 2022 Traralgon International with Zdenek Kolar.

In March, he won his maiden singles 2022 Challenger di Roseto degli Abruzzi II title as an Alternate.

In April, he made his ATP debut as a lucky loser at the 2022 Barcelona Open Banc Sabadell where he lost to Hugo Dellien. He reached a career-high singles ranking of No. 151 on 25 April 2022.

In May, Guinard was awarded wildcards into the main draw of the 2022 French Open in singles and doubles partnering Enzo Couacaud.

He qualified for the 2022 ATP Lyon Open main draw and defeated compatriot World No. 68 and wildcard  Hugo Gaston in the first round for his first tour-level win. He went on to defeat Michael Mmoh in the next round to reach the quarterfinals for the first time in his career.  As a result, he reached the top 150 in the rankings.

Grand Slam performance timeline

Singles

Doubles

Challenger and Futures/World Tennis Tour finals

Singles: 13 (10 titles, 3 runners-up)

Doubles: 17 (12 titles, 5 runners-up)

Notes

References

External links
 
 

1995 births
Living people
French male tennis players
Sportspeople from Saint-Malo